Twin Rivers may refer to:

Twin Rivers, East Riding of Yorkshire, England
Twin Rivers, New Jersey, United States
Twin Rivers (film), a 2007 Australian film
Longford River and Duke of Northumberlands River near Heathrow Airport, London
Twin Rivers Diversion Scheme, part of the construction of Terminal 5 at Heathrow Airport

See also
Twin River, British Columbia, Canada
North Twin River and South Twin River, Nevada, United States